Florida's 26th congressional district is an electoral district for the U.S. Congress, which was first created in South Florida in 2013 as a result of Florida's population gain in the 2010 Census. In the 2020 redistricting cycle, it was drawn as a successor to the previous 25th district and includes most of inland Collier County as well as the northwestern suburbs of Miami, including Doral, Hialeah, Miami Lakes, and some neighborhoods in Miami itself, such as Allapattah and Wynwood. The previous iteration of the 26th district, which included Monroe County and the southwestern suburbs of Miami, was instead renamed as the newly-created 28th district.

From 2013 to 2023, the 26th district was located in far South Florida, and contains all of Monroe County as well as a portion of south-west Miami-Dade County. Geographically, it was the successor to the old 25th District and included Homestead, Key Largo, Marathon, and Key West, as well as Florida International University, Key West International Airport, and all three of Florida's national parks.

Republican Mario Díaz-Balart currently represents the district.

Demographics 
According to the APM Research Lab's Voter Profile Tools (featuring the U.S. Census Bureau's 2019 American Community Survey), the district contained about 482,000 potential voters (citizens, age 18+). Of these, 68% are Latino, 18% White, and 12% Black. Nearly half (49%) of the district's potential voters are immigrants. Median income among households (with one or more potential voter) in the district is about $68,200, while 11% of households live below the poverty line. As for the educational attainment of potential voters in the district, 15% of those 25 and older have not earned a high school degree, while 28% hold a bachelor's or higher degree.

Statewide election results

Presidential election results
Results from previous presidential elections. Florida's 26th district was the only congressional district to vote for the Democratic candidate for President in 2012 and 2016, then flip to the Republican candidate (Donald Trump) in 2020.

State election results
Results from previous non-presidential statewide elections

List of members representing the district

Election results

2012

2014

2016

2018

2020

2022

References

26
Constituencies established in 2013
2013 establishments in Florida